This list of pagodas in Beijing comprises all Buddhist and Taoist pagodas erected within Beijing Municipality, an area which covers the city of Beijing as well as its surrounding districts and counties.  The list includes some important pagodas that are no longer standing.

Pagodas have been erected in the city of Beijing since at least the Sui dynasty (581–618).  Many large-scale pagodas were erected during the Liao dynasty (907–1125), when Beijing was one of the four secondary capitals established by the Khitans. Most of the pagodas built during the Liao dynasty are octagonal, solid pagodas made out of brick and stone, with multiple tiers of closely spaced eaves.  Important examples of Liao pagodas in Beijing include the Tiankai pagoda (erected c.1110), the Yunju pagoda (erected c. 1118). and the Tianning pagoda (erected c. 1120). The latter pagoda is the oldest surviving major building in the city of Beijing.

Beijing was promoted to be the principal capital of the Jurchen Jin dynasty (1115–1234) in 1153.  The Jin capital was destroyed by the Mongols, under Genghis Khan, in 1215, and no pagodas dating from this period survive within the city of Beijing.  However, a group of five pagodas erected within a temple at Silver Mountain (銀山) near Beijing is still standing.

During the Yuan dynasty (1271–1368), Beijing was for the first time the capital of all China, and under the auspices of Kublai Khan the city (known as Khanbaliq in Mongolian or Dadu in Chinese) was rebuilt on a grander scale.  Pagodas constructed during the Yuan dynasty include traditional Liao-style multi-eaved pagodas, such as the twin pagodas of Qingshou Temple (demolished in 1954).  In addition, as the Mongolian rulers of the Yuan dynasty were patrons of Tibetan Buddhism, this period saw the introduction of a new Tibetan style pagoda, painted white and in the shape of a stupa (or an inverted monk's begging bowl), often referred to as a dagoba. The fine example of a white dagoba at Miaoying Temple was commissioned by Kublai Khan in 1271, and constructed under the supervision of the Nepali architect Araniko (Arginer). An unusual "straddling the street pagoda", consisting of an arch surmounted by three white dagobas was built by command of the last Yuan emperor, Toghon Temür, in 1342–1345, although now only the arch base is still standing.

Beijing continued as the capital of China during most of the Ming dynasty (1368–1644).  A fine example of a Ming dynasty pagoda is the Pagoda of Cishou Temple, built in 1576 by the Wanli Emperor for the Empress Dowager Li, which is modelled on the Liao dynasty pagoda at Tianning Temple.

Beijing was the capital of China throughout the Qing dynasty (1644–1911). Like the Mongolians during the Yuan dynasty, the Manchu rulers of the Qing dynasty were patrons of Tibetan Buddhism, and so the Qing dynasty saw the erection of further examples of Tibetan-style white dagobas, including examples at Dajue Temple and on an island in Beihai Park.  Other examples of pagodas from this period include the Duobao Glazed Pagoda in the Summer Palace, which is covered in glazed statuettes of a buddhas.

During the 20th century, some pagodas in Beijing were destroyed by war, particularly during the Second Sino-Japanese War (1937–1945).  After the founding of the People's Republic of China in 1949, a new era of modernization threatened the survival of many ancient buildings and structures in Beijing.   Despite the vocal protests of the architect Liang Sicheng, a pair of famous pagodas in the centre of the city (the twin pagodas of Qingshou Temple), built during the Yuan dynasty, were demolished in 1954 so that Chang'an Avenue could be enlargened.

List of pagodas

Notes

References

External links

Pagodas
 
Pagodas in China
Pagodas
Pagodas
Pagodas
Pagodas in Beijing